Shawkat (variations include Shaukat, Shavkat, or Şevket) is a masculine Arabic given name of a Perso-Turkish origin, it is also used as a surname. It may refer to:

People
Alia Shawkat, American actress best known from her role in the television series Arrested Development
Assef Shawkat, head of Syria's military intelligence
Naji Shawkat, Iraqi politician and cabinet member who served briefly as prime minister (Nov 3, 1932-Mar 18, 1933)
Shawkat Ali, leader of Language Movement in Bangladesh
Shawkat Ali, politician and deputy speaker of Bangladesh
Shawkat Ali, novelist from Bangladesh
Shawkat Osman, Bangladeshi novelist and short story writer
Awn Shawkat Al-Khasawneh, vice-President of the International Court of Justice
Shaukat Dukanwala, UAE cricketer
Shaukat Aziz, former Prime Minister of Pakistan
Shaukat Hameed Khan, Pakistani nuclear physicist and former director of Pakistan Atomic Energy Commission (PAEC)
Syed Shaukat Hussain Rizvi, Indian director and producer
Maulana Shaukat Ali, Indian Muslim nationalist
Major General Shaukat Sultan, former Pakistani director general of Inter Services Public Relations (ISPR)
Shaukat Hayat Khan, a prominent Muslim league worker and supporter of Pakistan Movement
Sardar Shaukat Hussein Khan Mazari, Pakistani politician

Institutions

Shaukat Khanum Memorial Cancer Hospital & Research Centre, a cancer research hospital and cancer research institute in Pakistan

Arabic-language surnames
Arabic masculine given names